Space rock is a music genre characterized by loose and lengthy song structures centered on instrumental textures that typically produce a hypnotic, otherworldly sound. It may feature distorted and reverberation-laden guitars, minimal drumming, languid vocals, synthesizers and lyrical themes of outer space and science fiction.

The genre emerged in late 1960s psychedelia and progressive rock bands such as Pink Floyd, Hawkwind, and Gong who explored a "cosmic" sound. Similar sounds were pursued in the early 1970s West German kosmische Musik ("cosmic music") scene. Later, the style was taken up in the mid-1980s by Spacemen 3, whose "drone-heavy" sound was avowedly inspired by and intended to accommodate drug use. By the 1990s, space rock developed into shoegazing, stoner rock and post-rock with bands such as the Verve, Flying Saucer Attack, and Orange Goblin.

History

Origins: 1950s-1960s

Humanity's entry into outer space provided ample subject matter for rock and roll and R&B songs from the mid-1950s through the early 1960s. It also inspired new sounds and sound effects to be used in the music itself. A prominent early example of space rock is the 1959 concept album I Hear a New World by British producer and songwriter Joe Meek. The album was inspired by the space race and concerned human's first close encounter with alien life forms. Meek then went on to have a UK and US No 1 success in 1961 with "Telstar", named after the newly launched communications satellite and thus intended to commemorate the new space age. Its main instrument was a clavioline, an electronic forerunner of the synthesizers.

The Beatles' song "Flying" (1967), originally titled "Aerial Tour Instrumental", was a psychedelic instrumental about the sensation of flying, whether in a craft or in your own head space. Jimi Hendrix is also an early innovator of the genre, with such tracks as "Third Stone from the Sun", "1983... (A Merman I Should Turn to Be)" and "The Stars That Play with Laughing Sam's Dice".

Pink Floyd's early albums contain pioneering examples of space rock: "Lucifer Sam", "Astronomy Domine", "Pow R. Toc H." and "Interstellar Overdrive" from their 1967 debut album The Piper at the Gates of Dawn are examples. Their second album A Saucerful of Secrets contained further examples: "Let There Be More Light" and "Set the Controls for the Heart of the Sun" with explicit science fiction themes, and their third, More (1969) had "Cirrus Minor".

Peak: 1970s-1980s
In the early 1970s, West Germany's kosmische Musik ("cosmic music") scene developed among artists who explored "spacy", ambient instrumental soundscapes. The term is frequently used as a synonym of krautrock, but may also be used as a German analogue to the English term "space rock". These artists often explored electronic music, synthesizers, and themes related to space or otherworldliness. Examples included artists like Ash Ra Tempel, Tangerine Dream, Popol Vuh, and Klaus Schulze.

In early 1971, Pink Floyd began writing the song that would become known as "Echoes", from the 1971 album Meddle. The song was performed from April until September 1971, with an alternative set of lyrics, written about two planets meeting in space. Before the Meddle album released, the lyrics were changed to an aquatic theme, because of the band's concern that they were being labelled as a space rock band.

A major album in the history of space rock was Hawkwind's Space Ritual (1973), a two-disc live album advertised as "88 minutes of brain-damage" documenting Hawkwind's 1972 tour that included a liquid light show and lasers, nude dancers (notably the earth-mother figure Stacia), wild costumes and psychedelic imagery. This hard-edged concert experience attracted a motley but dedicated collection of psychedelic drug users, science-fiction fans and motorcycle riders. The science fiction author Michael Moorcock collaborated with Hawkwind on many occasions and wrote the lyrics for many of the spoken-word sections on Space Ritual. In Europe, Hungarian band Omega was the biggest space rock band with albums Time Robber (1976), Skyrover (1978), and Gammapolis (1979).  Other European bands include the progressive rock groups Eloy and Nektar. Nektar, who were known for having a rhythmic liquid/slide light show at their concerts, released their album Journey to the Centre of the Eye in 1971.

From 1980s to 1990s, Magic Mushroom Band and Ozric Tentacles released space rock albums.

1990s revival

Shoegazing, stoner rock/metal and noise pop genres emerged in the mainstream with the explosion of bands such as Julian Cope, Swervedriver, Slowdive, the Verve, My Bloody Valentine, Flying Saucer Attack, Klaus Schulze, Ride, the Flaming Lips, Orange Goblin, Spacemen 3, Spiritualized, Mercury Rev, Godspeed You! Black Emperor, Monster Magnet, The Brian Jonestown Massacre, Richard Ashcroft, David Jackson, Magic Mushroom Band, and Ozric Tentacles. The sonic experimentation and emphasis placed on texture by these bands led their music to be dubbed "space rock".

In the mid-1990s, a number of bands built on the space rock styles of Hawkwind and Gong appeared in America. Some of these bands were signed to Cleopatra Records, which then proceeded to release numerous space rock compilations. Starting in 1997, Daevid Allen of Gong, along with members of Hawkwind and other space rock bands, started to perform with Spirits Burning, a studio project created to celebrate space rock.

The Strange Daze festivals from 1997 to 2001 showcased the American space rock scene in three-day outdoor festivals. A Michigan-based space rock scene included Burnt Hair Records, Darla Records, and bands such as Windy & Carl, Mahogany, Sweet Trip, Füxa and Auburn Lull. This was a modern movement of the traditional "space rock" sound and was pinned Detroit Space Rock.

French band Air released albums Moon Safari, 10,000 Hz Legend and Le voyage dans la lune. Dutch band The Gathering released albums How to Measure a Planet? and If_Then_Else with space rock influences.

21st century
In 2005, Tom DeLonge formed the rock supergroup Angels & Airwaves, who are known for having space rock influences in both its music and lyrics, in addition to having space-themed imagery and artwork.

In 2006 the British rock band Muse released the song Knights of Cydonia which is heavily inspired by the song Telstar from the Tornados a band that frontman Matt Bellamy's father was a member of.

In 2009 an off-duty NASA worker from the shuttle program synchronised footage of a Discovery launch with the Flowers of Hell's "Sympathy for Vengeance" in an online video which became popular amongst staff at the Kennedy Space Center.

The progressive rock band Starset is heavily influenced by space and astronomy, and many of their songs reference themes commonly associated with space.

In 2018, British rock band Arctic Monkeys released their sixth studio album, Tranquility Base Hotel & Casino, based on frontman Alex Turner's concept of a luxury resort on the moon for rockstars. The album centres around topics of interstellar travel, consumerism, science fiction and technology, and features several characters such as an unnamed retired rockstar who serves as the narrator for several tracks, 'Mark', the titular hotel's receptionist, and the fictional 'Martini Police' mentioned in the track 'Star Treatment'.

See also
Space-themed music
Space music
Space disco
Space age pop

References

 
Progressive rock
Psychedelic rock
English styles of music
British rock music genres

tr:Space metal